Xue Tao, courtesy name Hongdu was a Chinese courtesan and poet of the Tang dynasty. She was one of the most famous women poets of Tang poetry, along with Yu Xuanji and Li Ye.

Life
Xue Tao was the daughter of a minor government official in Chang'an, which was the Chinese capital during the Tang Dynasty. Her father, Xue Yun was transferred to Chengdu, when she was still little, or possibly before her birth. Her father died while she was young, but it's possible that she had some literary education from him; her adult career also offered her the opportunity to learn from practicing poets.

Since the girl's mother did not return to Chang'an, it is possible that they were too poor to do so. Xue was registered with the guild of courtesans and entertainers in Chengdu and in time became well known for her wit and her poetic talent.

Her poetry attracted the attention of Wei Gao, the military governor of Xichuan Circuit (headquartered in modern Chengdu, Sichuan) and she was made his official hostess. In this position she met poets like  Yuan Zhen, to whom she was said to have become close; at the very least, this story indicates the charisma of both figures. Certainly, she exchanged poems with Yuan and many other well-known writers of the day, and continued as hostess after Wei's death.

When Wu Yuanheng became governor in 807, she presented him with two poems. Wu was so impressed that he asked the Emperor to appoint Xue as an editor (jiaoshu) in his office. This was an unusual request as Xue was both a woman and a government courtesan. Although Xue was never given the position, she became known as the "female editor". Later "editor" became a euphemism for a courtesan.

In later years, Xue was able to live independently in a site outside the city associated with the great poet of an earlier generation, Du Fu. Some sources record that she supported herself as a maker of artisanal paper used for writing poems. A contemporary wrote that she took on the garments of a Daoist adept, signaling a relatively autonomous status within Tang society.

Hsueh Tao, a Venusian crater, is named after her.

Poems
Some 450 poems by Xue were gathered in The Brocade River Collection that survived until the 14th century. About 100 of her poems are known nowadays, which is more than of any other Tang dynasty woman. They range widely in tone and topic, giving evidence of a lively intelligence and deep knowledge of the great tradition of earlier Chinese poetry.

References

Sources
 
 
 Larsen, Jeanne (1983). The Chinese Poet Xue Tao: The Life and Works of a Mid-Tang Woman. (unpublished doctoral dissertation, University of Iowa)
 Larsen, Jeanne, translator (1987). Brocade River Poems: Selected Works of the Tang Dynasty Courtesan Xue Tao. Princeton University Press. (with introduction and notes)
 Larsen, Jeanne, translator (2005). Willow, Wine, Mirror, Moon: Women's Poems from Tang China. BOA Editions, Ltd. (contains translations of seven more poems by Xue, with notes)
 
 Ma, Maoyuan, "Xue Tao". Encyclopedia of China (Chinese Literature Edition), 1st ed.
 
"Xue Tao" from Other Women's voices, Translations of women's writing before 1700, last accessed June 4, 2007

External links

Translation of poetry by Xue Tao

770s births
831 deaths
8th-century Chinese poets
8th-century Chinese women writers
9th-century Chinese poets
9th-century Chinese women writers
Chinese courtesans
Chinese women poets
Poets from Shaanxi
Tang dynasty poets
Writers from Xi'an